Escape from the MindMaster was a video game
for the Starpath Supercharger addon for the Atari 2600 published in 1982 by Starpath.

Escape from the MindMaster utilizes a tape cassette through the Starpath Supercharger. This is used to bypass the 2K limitation of available memory in the Atari 2600. Each game has 6 levels, 2 levels per load, giving an effective total of 6K for each game, which allows for better graphics and more complicated gameplay than the average 2K cartridge. A port of this game for the Atari 7800 was planned, and a prototype version of the game was created, but these plans were shelved after Starpath merged with Epyx in 1984.

Gameplay
The player's goal in the game is to solve the maze consisting of a series of hallways and rooms. The rooms either were empty, contained puzzle pegs, or had a bonus game that allowed the user to collect more points. Each level had its own individual bonus game.

To solve the maze, players had to collect keys called "puzzle pegs" that are designed as shapes to find their corresponding sockets. Only one peg can be held on to one at a time. After placing all the pegs correctly, the player is able to go on to the next level through a now unlocked door. As the levels advanced, the pegs begin to appear more similar to confuse the player.  The pegs are placed randomly each time the game is re-booted. There is a time limit in which to finish the maze by, although you are not penalized for exceeding the time, you do get bonus points for each second under the time.

This must be done all the while avoiding the Alien stalker which would be roaming the maze. If it gets too close to you, you would have to start again. There are two parts to each maze, a safe part, and the part where the creature is, separated by doors.  Regardless of which room the player is in, you can tell how close the creature is by the beeping he makes. The louder and faster, the closer it is. In the more advanced mazes, there are also large squares that slide out of a wall into the adjacent wall which must be avoided in order for the player to progress. The third maze introduces one way doors, which disappear once you go through them, making you continue some other route.

ESCAPE FROM THE MIND MASTER for Atari 2600 by Starpath was a 2D game played on 6 levels. The player had to avoid the Alien stalker while collecting pegs and placing them in the right parts of the maze corridors while solving the puzzle in each level of the maze. It had terrible graphics by today's standards but it was absolutely frightening to play 40 years ago if you had seen the movie ALIEN. The louder the noise became meant the Alien was that much closer but you could never tell from which direction it was coming or if it was right next to you in another adjacent corridor of the maze. When you cleared the final level, fireworks went off.

Reception 
In 1995, Flux magazine ranked Mindmaster 77th on their Top 100 Video Games.  They described the game as "A creepy and claustrophobic classic."

Notes

External links
Escape From the Mindmaster at Atari age

1982 video games
Adventure games
Atari 2600 games
Atari 2600-only games
Cancelled Atari 7800 games
North America-exclusive video games
Starpath games
Video games developed in the United States
Single-player video games